On June 3–4, 1958, a destructive tornado outbreak affected the Upper Midwestern United States.  It was the deadliest tornado outbreak in the U.S. state of Wisconsin since records began in 1950. The outbreak, which initiated in Central Minnesota, killed at least 28 people, all of whom perished in Northwestern Wisconsin. The outbreak generated a long-lived tornado family that produced four intense tornadoes across the Eau Claire–Chippewa Falls metropolitan area, primarily along and near the Chippewa and Eau Claire rivers. The deadliest tornado of the outbreak was a destructive F5 that killed 21 people and injured 110 others in and near Colfax, Wisconsin.

Background

Confirmed tornadoes

June 3 event

June 4 event

Wildwood–Wilson–Knapp–Cedar Falls–Colfax, Wisconsin

CDT (23:30 UTC). As it headed generally eastward or east-northeastward, the tornado claimed three lives: one near Wilson and two more just south of Knapp. Entering the northern outskirts of Menomonie, the tornado devastated the small settlement of Cedar Falls, destroying 24 of the 25 homes in that community. Four fatalities occurred in or near Cedar Falls, along with several injuries.

After striking Cedar Falls, the tornado turned more to the northeast, and struck the northwestern side of Colfax. Eyewitnesses reported two tornadoes: one in northern Colfax and another just south of downtown. The latter tornado reportedly hit the southeastern section of Colfax. Damage in Colfax alone was estimated at $2 million, and about half of the buildings in town were destroyed. "Dozens" of homes were leveled, several of which were swept away, leaving empty foundations behind. Farmhouses were leveled east of town as well. Telephone poles were snapped and trees were debarked as well. About 432 farms were damaged or destroyed, along with another 1,032 structures. Debris was found as far as  distant, in Sheldon. At least 12 people within Colfax, and as many as 15 if persons nearby are included, were killed.

The Colfax tornado was the first official F5 tornado to strike the state since records were made official in 1950, although the 1899 New Richmond tornado is unofficially considered to be F5 as well. The next F5 tornado to strike Wisconsin was on June 8, 1984, when an overnight tornado destroyed Barneveld, killing nine people. Tornado researcher Thomas P. Grazulis assigned an F4 rating to the Colfax tornado in his Significant Tornadoes, but subsequently listed the event as an F5 in his supplementary report F5–F6 Tornadoes.

Non-tornadic effects

Impact

Aftermath and recovery
The storms, in addition to the fatalities and destruction, also cut utility and communication services through the region thus isolating many communities until help was provided from several areas including from the Twin Cities region about an hour west of the affected areas. Then-Governor of Wisconsin Vernon Thomson ordered three groups of National Guard troops in the affected area for rescue and rehabilitation duties.

See also
List of tornadoes and tornado outbreaks
List of North American tornadoes and tornado outbreaks
List of F5 and EF5 tornadoes
1899 New Richmond tornado – Deadliest tornado on record in Wisconsin
1984 Barneveld tornado outbreak – Produced a deadly F5 tornado overnight in Wisconsin

Notes

References

Sources

C
C
C
Colfax, Wisconsin Tornado Outbreak, 1958
June 1958 events in the United States